Hamilton Brown (1776 – 18 September 1843) was a Scots-Irish planter, slave owner, and politician in Saint Ann Parish, Jamaica which he represented in the House of Assembly of Jamaica for 22 years. Brown founded the settlement of Hamilton Town in Saint Ann Parish, which was named after him.

Early life
Hamilton Brown was born in 1776, to an Ulster-Scots Presbyterian family in County Antrim, Ireland.

Career

Brown began his career as an estate bookkeeper but acquired significant land holdings and agricultural interests in the British colony of Jamaica. He was a pen-keeper (cattle breeder) and was responsible for a large cattle fair held on Pedro Plains in Saint Elizabeth Parish in 1829. He also grew sugar and owned the Antrim, Colliston, Grier Park, and Minard plantations, all in St Ann, as well as having interests in numerous others.

He gave his name to Brown's Town, originally known as Hamilton Town, in St Ann, which he founded, and in 1805 he paid for the construction of the original St Mark's Anglican Church in Brown's Town.

He was a member of the House of Assembly of Jamaica in 1820 and represented Saint Ann Parish in that assembly for 22 years. In 1832, he met Henry Whiteley on his trip to Jamaica to whom he argued that Jamaican slaves were better off than the English poor and therefore the British government should not interfere with the way the Jamaican planters managed their slaves; Whiteley went on to witness harsh and arbitrary whipping of slaves at the plantations that he visited during his stay.

According to the Legacies of British Slave-Ownership at the University College London, Brown was awarded a payment under the Slave Compensation Act 1837 as a former slave owner in the aftermath of the Slavery Abolition Act 1833. The British Government took out a £15 million loan (worth £ in ) with interest from Nathan Mayer Rothschild and Moses Montefiore which was subsequently paid off by the British taxpayers (ending in 2015). Brown was a prolific slave owner in the context of Jamaican society and was associated with a large number of claims, twenty-five in total, he owned 1,120 slaves most of them on sugar plantations in Saint Ann Parish and received a £24,144 (equivalent to £ in ) payment at the time.

Brown was active in trying to recruit Irish people to work in Jamaica. In December 1835, 121 people from Ballymoney, Antrim, set off from Belfast for Jamaica on the James Ray, a brig owned by Brown. They settled in St Ann. In 1836 he brought a further 185 Irish people to Saint Ann. An effort by planters in 1840 to encourage large-scale Irish migration to Jamaica to settle lands that might otherwise be occupied by newly freed slaves, failed after the project was criticised in Ireland as potentially transforming the migrants into slaves.

Death
Brown died on 18 September 1843 and is buried in the Protestant graveyard of St Mark's Anglican church in Brown's Town, Jamaica.

References

Further reading
 Senior, Carl H. "Robert Kerr: Emigrants of 1840 Irish Slaves for Jamaica", Jamaica Journal, No. 42 (1978), pp. 104–116.

External links 
 Fact check: Kamala Harris is “a cop whose family owned slaves in Jamaica” claim is missing context Reuters
 Snopes report on claim that U.S Senator Kamala Harris is a descendant of Hamilton Brown
 Kamala Harris Family History

1776 births
1843 deaths
Members of the House of Assembly of Jamaica
Jamaican landowners
People from Saint Ann Parish
Irish slave owners
19th-century Irish businesspeople
19th-century Jamaican people
Irish emigrants to Jamaica
People from County Antrim
Bookkeepers
Ulster Scots people
Recipients of payments from the Slavery Abolition Act 1833